Dmitriev-Mamonov is a Russian masculine surname that may refer to
Alexander Dmitriev-Mamonov (1758–1803), Russian noble
Matvey Dmitriev-Mamonov (1790–1863), Russian noble and writer, son of Alexander
Alexander Ivanovich Dmitriev-Mamonov (1787–1836), Russian military commander and battle painter, father of Emmanuil
Emmanuil Dmitriev-Mamonov (1824–1883), Russian portrait painter and Slavophile
Russian-language surnames